Sodupe Unión Club is a Spanish football team located in Sodupe in the Basque Autonomous Community. Founded in 1947, it currently plays in Tercera División – Group 4, holding home matches at Campo Lorenzo Hurtado de Saratxo with a capacity of 1,500 spectators.

History 
Sodupe UC was founded in 1947.

Season to season

15 seasons in Tercera División

References 

Football clubs in the Basque Country (autonomous community)
Association football clubs established in 1947
1947 establishments in Spain
Sport in Biscay